Garage Classics is the debut album by the House & Garage Orchestra, released on 30 November 2018 on the New State Music label. It was released on CD and as a digital download. The album was produced by Darren Tate and Alex Mereier (Shy Cookie), and contains orchestral covers of classic UK garage tracks with appearances from Kele Le Roc, Sweet Female Attitude, Shola Ama, Shelley Nelson, MC Neat, Tough Love and more.

Touring
To promote the album, the House & Garage Orchestra toured and performed live shows around the UK in venues such as the Albert Hall in Manchester, Tramshed in Cardiff, Liverpool Olympia, Brighton Dome, Portsmouth Guildhall, KOKO, Shepherd's Bush Empire and the Roundhouse, and continue to do so having performed throughout 2021 and with scheduled concerts planned for 2022.

In a review of their show at The Globe in Cardiff, Campbell Prosser, writing for Buzz Magazine said: "It was refreshing and impressive to hear iconic UK garage tracks performed with live musicians and instruments" and that "The vocal performances were a real highlight." Summing up the review, he concluded: "Although the magnitude of the performance wasn't exactly as expected – albeit likely due to my own misguided assumptions – the artists and musicians made up for this with their visible passion for the genre. They've clearly mastered what was/is the garage scene and adding this twist breathes new life into some iconic tracks."

Chart performance
Garage Classics reached No. 37 on the UK Digital Albums Chart.

Track listing

Charts

See also
Garage Classical

References

2018 debut albums
UK garage albums
Covers albums